Ectatomma tuberculatum is a Neotropical species of ant in the subfamily Ectatomminae. Common in the Neotropics, the species is found from Mexico to Argentina. It is a host to the related social parasite Ectatomma parasiticum, the only known parasitic species in the subfamily Ectatomminae.

See also
Ectatomin

References

External links

Ectatomminae
Hymenoptera of North America
Hymenoptera of South America
Insects of Central America
Insects described in 1792
Taxa named by Guillaume-Antoine Olivier